Anderson & Sheppard is a bespoke tailor on Savile Row, London, established in the Row itself in 1906. Its bespoke tailoring shop is in Old Burlington Street, whence it moved in 2005. It also sells ready-made menswear from its old school style 'haberdashery' shop premises in nearby Clifford Street, as well as online.

Since 2004, it has been owned by Anda Rowland, who inherited it from her father, Roland "Tiny" Rowland. The head cutter is John Hitchcock.

Clientele
Former devotees have included Fred Astaire, Gary Cooper, Noël Coward, and Bryan Ferry.  Anderson & Sheppard kept Prince Charles in double breasted suits for years.  In 2004, Tom Ford became a customer of the firm, commissioning suits that would later appear in a   W magazine photo shoot.

References

External links
Company web site

Savile Row Bespoke Association members
Clothing companies established in 1906
Companies based in the City of Westminster
High fashion brands
Luxury brands
1906 establishments in England
British suit makers
Clothing brands of the United Kingdom